Television content rating systems are systems for evaluating the content and reporting the suitability of television programs for minors. Many countries have their own television rating system and countries' rating processes vary by local priorities. Programs are rated by the organization that manages the system, the broadcaster, or the content producers.

A rating is usually set for each individual episode of a television series. The rating can change per episode, network, rerun, and country. As such, program ratings are usually not meaningful unless when and where the rating is used is mentioned.

Comparison table 
A comparison of current television content rating systems, showing age on the horizontal axis. Note however that the specific criteria used in assigning a classification can vary widely from one country to another. Thus a color code or age range cannot be directly compared from one country to another.

Key:

  White  – No restrictions: Suitable for all ages / Aimed at young audiences / Exempt / Not rated / No applicable rating.
  Yellow  – No restrictions: Parental guidance is suggested for designated age range.
  Purple  – No restrictions: Not recommended for a younger audience but not restricted.
  Red  – Restricted: Parental accompaniment required for younger audiences.
  Black  – Prohibitive: Exclusively for older audience / Restricted to a specific audience / Purchase age-restricted / Banned.

{| class="wikitable" style="text-align:center"
|-
! Country/System !! 0/1 !! 2 !! 3 !! 4 !! 5 !! 6 !! 7 !! 8 !! 9 !! 10 !! 11 !! 12 !! 13 !! 14 !! 15 !! 16 !! 17 !! 18 !! 19 !! 20 !! 21 !! Other !! Time restrictions(watershed)
|-
! style="text-align:left" |  Argentina
| colspan="12" style="background:white;" | ATP
| colspan="3" style="background:purple; color:white;" | +13
| colspan="2" style="background:purple; color:white;" | +16
| colspan="4" style="background:purple; color:white;" | +18
| colspan="1" style="background:white; color:black;" | N/A
| style="width:150px; line-height:75%; " | 
|-
! rowspan="2" style="text-align:left" |  Armenia
| colspan="1" style="background:white;" | GA
| colspan="3" style="background:purple; color:white;" | EC
| colspan="4" style="background:purple; color:white;" | E
| colspan="3" style="background:purple; color:white;" | E9/TW
| colspan="4" style="background:purple; color:white;" | T
| colspan="1" style="background:purple; color:white;" | M
| rowspan="2" colspan="1" style="background:black; color:white;" | AO
| rowspan="2" colspan="4" style="background:black; color:white;" | A
| rowspan="2" style="background:white;" | N/A
| rowspan="2" style="background:white;" | N/A
|-
| colspan="6" style="background:white;" | Y
| colspan="10" style="background:purple;color:white;" | Y7
|-
! rowspan="3" style="text-align:left" |  Australia
| colspan="14" style="background:white;" | 
| colspan="3" style="background:purple; color:white;" | M
| rowspan="2" colspan="4" style="background:black; Color:white;" | 
| rowspan="3" colspan="1" style="background:white; color:black;" | 
| rowspan="3" style="width:150px; line-height:75%; " | 
|-
| colspan="14" style="background:yellow;" | PG
| rowspan="1" colspan="3" style="background:red; Color:white;" | MA 15+
|-
| colspan="4" style="background:white;" | 
| colspan="9" style="background:purple;color:white;" | 
| colspan="4" style="background:white; color:black;" | N/A
| rowspan="1" colspan="4" style="background:black; Color:white;" | 
|-
! style="text-align:left" |  Brazil
| colspan="9" style="background:white;" | L
| colspan="2" style="background:purple; color:white;" | 10
| colspan="2" style="background:purple; color:white;" | 12
| colspan="2" style="background:purple; color:white;" | 14
| colspan="2" style="background:purple; color:white;" | 16
| colspan="4" style="background:purple; color:white;" | 18
| colspan="1" style="background:white; color:black;" | N/A
| rowspan="1" style="width:150px; line-height:75%; " | N/A
|-
! style="text-align:left" |  Bulgaria
| colspan="11" style="background:white;" | Unrated
| colspan="2" style="background:purple; color:white;" | 12
| colspan="2" style="background:purple; color:white;" | 14
| colspan="2" style="background:purple; color:white;" | 16
| colspan="4" style="background:purple; color:white;" | 18
| style="background:white;" | N/A
| style="width:150px; line-height:75%; " | 
|-
! rowspan="2" style="text-align:left" |  Canada   
| colspan="7" style="background:white;" | G
| colspan="6" style="background:yellow;" | PG
| rowspan="2" colspan="4" style="background:purple; color:white;"| 14+
| rowspan="2" colspan="4" style="background:purple; color:white;"| 18+
| rowspan="3" style="background:white; color:black;" | 
| rowspan="3" style="width:150px; line-height:75%; " | 
|-
| colspan="7" style="background:white;" | 
| colspan="6" style="background:purple; color:white;" | 
|-
! style="text-align:left" |  Quebec | colspan="7" style="background:white;" | G
| colspan="5" style="background:purple; color:white;" | 8
| colspan="3" style="background:purple; color:white;" | 13
| colspan="2" style="background:purple; color:white;" | 16
| colspan="4" style="background:purple; color:white;" | 18
|-
! style="text-align:left" rowspan="2"|  Chile
| colspan="11" style="background:white;" | F
| colspan="6" style="background:red; color:white;" | R
| colspan="4" rowspan="2" style="background:black; color:white;" | A
| colspan="1" rowspan="2" style="background:white; color:black;" | N/A
| rowspan="2" style="width:150px; line-height:75%; " | 
|-
| colspan="6" style="background:white;" | I| colspan="3" style="background:purple;color:white;" | I7| colspan="2" style="background:purple;color:white;" | I10| colspan="6" style="background:purple;;color:white;" | I12|-
! style="text-align:left" |  Colombia
| colspan="11" style="background:white;" | PTA
| colspan="10" style="background:black; color:white;" | 
| colspan="1" style="background:white; color:black;" | N/A
| rowspan="1" style="width:150px; line-height:75%; " | 
|-
! style="text-align:left" rowspan="1"|  Croatia
| colspan="11" colspan="11" style="background:white;" | Unrated
| colspan="3"  colspan="3" style="background:purple; color:white;" | 12
| colspan="3"  colspan="3" style="background:purple; color:white;" | 15
| colspan="3"  colspan="4" style="background:purple; color:white;" | 18
| rowspan="1" style="background:white; color:black;" | N/A
| rowspan="1" style="width:150px; line-height:75%; " | 
|-
! style="text-align:left" rowspan="1"|  Czech Republic
| colspan="17" colspan="17" style="background:white;" | Unrated
| colspan="4"  colspan="4" style="background:purple; color:white;" | *
| rowspan="1" style="background:white; color:black;" | N/A
| rowspan="1" style="width:150px; line-height:75%; " | 
|-
! rowspan="1" style="text-align:left" |  Denmark
| colspan="6" colspan="6" style="background:white;" | A
| colspan="4" colspan="4" style="background:purple; color:white;" | 7
| colspan="4" colspan="4" style="background:black; color:white;" | 11
| colspan="7" colspan="7" style="background:black; color:white;" | 15
| rowspan="1" style="background:white; color:black;" | N/A
| rowspan="1" style="width:150px; line-height:75%;  | N/A
|-
! rowspan="1" style="text-align:left" |  Ecuador
| colspan="11" style="background:white;" | A
| colspan="6" style="background:red; color:white;" | B
| colspan="4" rowspan="1" style="background:black; color:white;" | C
| rowspan="1" style="background:white; color:black;" | N/A
| rowspan="1" style="width:150px; line-height:75%; " | 
|-
! style="text-align:left" |  El Salvador
| colspan="11" style="background:white;" | A
| colspan="3" style="background:purple; color:white;" | B
| colspan="3" style="background:purple; color:white;" | C
| colspan="3" style="background:purple; color:white;" | D
| colspan="1" style="background:purple; color:white;" | E
| colspan="1" style="background:white; color:black;" | N/A
| rowspan="1" style="width:150px; line-height:75%; " | 
|-
! style="text-align:left" |  Finland
| colspan="6" style="background:white;" | S
| colspan="5" style="background:purple; color:white;" | K7
| colspan="4" style="background:purple; color:white;" | K12
| colspan="2" style="background:purple; color:white;" | K16
| colspan="4" style="background:purple; color:white;" | K18
| colspan="1" style="background:white; color:black;" | N/A
| rowspan="1" style="width:150px; line-height:75%; " | 
|-
! style="text-align:left" |  France
| colspan="9" style="background:white;" | Unrated
| colspan="2" style="background:purple; color:white;" | –10
| colspan="4" style="background:purple; color:white;" | –12
| colspan="2" style="background:purple; color:white;" | –16
| colspan="4" style="background:purple; color:white;" | –18
| colspan="1" style="background:white; color:black;" | N/A
| rowspan="1" style="width:150px; line-height:75%; " | 
|-
! rowspan="1" style="text-align:left" |  Germany
| colspan="15" style="background:white;" | Unrated
| colspan="2" style="background:black; color:white;" | 16
| colspan="4" style="background:black; color:white;" | 18
| rowspan="1" style="background:white; color:black;" | N/A
| rowspan="1" style="width:150px; line-height:75%; " | 
|-
! style="text-align:left" |  Greece &   Cyprus
| colspan="7" style="background:white;" | 
| colspan="4" style="background:purple; color:white;" | 8
| colspan="4" style="background:purple; color:white;" | 12
| colspan="2" style="background:purple; color:white;" | 16
| colspan="4" style="background:purple; color:white;" | 18
| style="background:white; color:black;" | N/A
| style="width:150px; line-height:75%; " | 
|-
! rowspan="2" style="text-align:left" |  Hong Kong
| colspan="17" style="background:white;" | Unrated
| colspan="4" rowspan="2" style="background:purple; color:white;" | M
| rowspan="2" style="background:white; color:black;" | N/A
| rowspan="2" style="width:150px; line-height:75%; " | 
|-
| colspan="17" style="background:yellow; color:black;" |  PG
|-
! rowspan="2" style="text-align:left" |  Hungary
| colspan="5" style="background:white;" | Unrated
| rowspan="2" colspan="6" style="background:purple; color:white;" | 6
| rowspan="2" colspan="4" style="background:purple; color:white;" | 12
| rowspan="2" colspan="2" style="background:purple; color:white;" | 16
| rowspan="2" colspan="4" style="background:purple; color:white;" | 18
| rowspan="2" style="background:white; color:black;" | N/A
| rowspan="2" style="width:150px; line-height:75%; " | 
|-
| colspan="5" style="background:white;" | 
|-
! style="text-align:left" |  India
|colspan="11" style="background:white; color:black;" | U
|colspan="6" style="background:red; Color:white;" | UA
|colspan="4" style="background:black; color:white;" | A
| colspan="1" style="background:black; color:white;" | 
| rowspan="1" style="width:150px; line-height:75%; " |  
|-
! rowspan="3" style="text-align:left" |  Indonesia
| rowspan="3" colspan="1" style="background:white; color:black;" | N/A
| colspan="5" style="background:white; color:black;" | SU
| rowspan="2" colspan="6" style="background:yellow; color:black;" | A–BO
| rowspan="2" colspan="5" style="background:yellow; color:black;" | R–BO
| rowspan="3" colspan="4" style="background:purple; Color:white;" | D
| rowspan="3" style="background:white; color:black;" | N/A
| rowspan="3" style="width:150px; line-height:75%; " | 
|-
| colspan="5" style="background:yellow; color:black;" | P–BO
|-
| colspan="5" style="background:white; color:black;" | 
| colspan="6" style="background:white; color:black;" | 
| colspan="5" style="background:white; color:black;" | 
|-
! rowspan="2" style="text-align:left" |  Israel
| colspan="11" style="background:white;" | Unrated
| rowspan="2" colspan="3" style="background:purple; color:white;" | 12+
| rowspan="2" colspan="3" style="background:purple; color:white;" | 15+
| rowspan="2" colspan="4" style="background:purple; color:white;" | 18+
| rowspan="2" style="background:white; color:black;" | 
| rowspan="2" style="width:150px; line-height:75%; " | N/A
|-
| colspan="11" style="background:yellow; color:black;" | AP
|-
! rowspan="2" style="text-align:left" |  Italy
| colspan="11" style="background:white" | T
| rowspan="2" colspan="2" style="background:purple; color:white;" | 12
| rowspan="2" colspan="4" style="background:purple; color:white;" | 14
| rowspan="2" colspan="4" style="background:purple; color:white;" | 18
| rowspan="2" style="background:white; color: black;" | N/A
| rowspan="2" style="width:150px; line-height:75%; " | N/A
|-
| colspan="11" style="background:yellow; color:black;" | BA
|-
! style="text-align:left" rowspan="1"|  Lithuania
| colspan="6" style="background:white;" | Unrated
| colspan="7" style="background:purple; color:white;" | N-7
| colspan="4" style="background:purple; color:white;" | N-14
| colspan="4" style="background:purple; color:white;" | S
| rowspan="1" style="background:white; color:black;" | N/A
| rowspan="1" style="width:150px; line-height:75%; " | 
|-
! style="text-align:left" |  Malaysia
| colspan="11" style="background:white;" | U
| colspan="1" style="background:red; color:white;" | P12
| colspan="3" style="background:black; color:white;" | 13
| colspan="2" style="background:black; color:white;" | 16
| colspan="4" style="background:black; color:white;" | 18
| rowspan="1" style="background:white; color:black;" | N/A
| rowspan="1" style="width:150px; line-height:75%; " | 
|-
! rowspan="2" style="text-align:left" |  Mexico
| colspan="11" style="background:white;" | A
| colspan="3" rowspan="2" style="background:purple; color:white;" | B
| colspan="3" rowspan="2" style="background:purple; color:white;" | B-15
| colspan="4" style="background:purple; color:white;" | C
| rowspan="2" style="background:white; color:black;" | N/A
| rowspan="2" style="width:150px; line-height:75%; " | 
|-
| colspan="11" style="background:white;" | 
| colspan="4" style="background:black; color:white;" | D
|-
! style="text-align:left" |  Morocco
| colspan="9" style="background:white;" | All audiences
| colspan="2" style="background:purple; color:white;" | -10
| colspan="4" style="background:purple; color:white;" | -12
| colspan="6" style="background:purple; color:white;" | -16
| rowspan="1" style="background:white; color:black;" | N/A
| rowspan="1" style="width:150px; line-height:75%; " | 
|-
! style="text-align:left" |  Netherlands
| colspan="5" style="background:white;" | AL
| colspan="3" style="background:purple; color:white;" | 6
| colspan="3" style="background:purple; color:white;" | 9
| colspan="2" style="background:purple; color:white;" | 12
| colspan="2" style="background:purple; color:white;" | 14
| colspan="2" style="background:purple; color:white;" | 16
| colspan="4" style="background:purple; color:white;" | 18
| rowspan="1" style="background:white; color:black;" | N/A
| rowspan="1" style="width:150px; line-height:75%; " | 
|-
! rowspan="2" style="text-align:left" |  New Zealand
| colspan="15" style="background:white;" | G
| colspan="2" style="background:purple; color:white;" | M
| rowspan="2" colspan="4" style="background:black; color:white;" | 18
| rowspan="2" style="background:white; color:black;" | N/A
| rowspan="2"  style="width:150px; line-height:75%; "|
|-
| colspan="15" style="background:yellow;" | PG
| colspan="2" style="background:black; color:white;" | 16
|-
! style="text-align:left" |  North Macedonia
| colspan="7" style="background:white;" | [Green circle]
| colspan="4" style="background:purple; color:white;" | [Yellow circle]
| colspan="4" style="background:purple; color:white;" | [Orange square]
| colspan="2" style="background:red; color:white;" | [Blue triangle]
| colspan="4" style="background:black; color:white;" | [Red cross]
| rowspan="1" style="background:white; color:black;" | N/A
| rowspan="1" style="width:150px; line-height:75%; " | 
|-
! style="text-align:left" |  Norway
| colspan="5" style="background:white;" | All ages
| colspan="3" style="background:purple; color:white;" | 6
| colspan="3" style="background:purple; color:white;" | 9
| colspan="3" style="background:purple; color:white;" | 12
| colspan="3" style="background:purple; color:white;" | 15
| colspan="4" style="background:purple; color:white;" | 18
| colspan="1" style="background:white; color:black;" | N/A
| rowspan="1" style="width:150px; line-height:75%; " | 
|-
! style="text-align:left" |  Peru
| colspan="13" style="background:white;" |  
| colspan="4" style="background:purple; color:white;" | 14
| colspan="4" style="background:purple; color:white;" | 18
| colspan="1" style="background:white; color:black;" | N/A
| rowspan="1" style="width:150px; line-height:75%; " | 
|-
! rowspan="2" style="text-align:left" |  Philippines
| colspan="12" style="background:white;" | G
| rowspan="2" colspan="9" style="background:red; color:white;" | 
| rowspan="2" style="background:white; color:black;" | N/A
| rowspan="2" style="width:150px; line-height:75%; " | N/A
|-
| colspan="12" style="background:yellow;" | PG
|-
! style="text-align:left" |  Poland
| colspan="6" style="background:white;" | 
| colspan="5" style="background:purple; color:white;"| 7
| colspan="4" style="background:purple; color:white;"| 12
| colspan="2" style="background:purple; color:white;"| 16
| colspan="4" style="background:black; color:white;"| 
| rowspan="1" style="background:white; color:black;" | N/A
| rowspan="1" style="width:150px; line-height:75%; " | 
|-
! style="text-align:left" |  Portugal
| colspan="9" style="background:white;" | 
| colspan="2" style="background:red; color:white;" | 10AP
| colspan="4" style="background:red; color:white;" | 12AP
| colspan="6" style="background:black; color:white;" | 16
| rowspan="1" style="background:white; color:black;" | N/A
| rowspan="1" style="width:150px; line-height:75%; " | 
|-
! rowspan="2" style="text-align:left" |  Romania
| colspan="11" style="background:white;" | Unrated
| rowspan="2" colspan="3" style="background:purple; color:white;" | 12
| rowspan="2" colspan="3" style="background:purple; color:white;" | 15
| rowspan="2" colspan="4" style="background:purple; color:white;" | 18
| rowspan="2" style="background:white; color:black;" | N/A
| rowspan="2" style="width:150px; line-height:75%; " | 
|-
| colspan="11" style="background:yellow; color:black;" | AP
|-
! style="text-align:left" |  Russia
| colspan="5" style="background:white;" | 0+
| colspan="6" style="background:purple; color:white;" | 6+
| colspan="4" style="background:purple; color:white;" | 12+
| colspan="2" style="background:purple; color:white;" | 16+
| colspan="4" style="background:black; color:white;" | 18+
| rowspan="1" style="background:white; color:black;" | N/A
| rowspan="1" style="width:150px; line-height:75%; " | 
|-
! rowspan="2" style="text-align:left" |  Singapore
| colspan="12" style="background:white;" | G
| rowspan="2" colspan="3" style="background:purple; color:white;" | PG13
| rowspan="2" colspan="2" style="background:black; color:white;" | 
| rowspan="2" colspan="3" style="background:black; color:white;" | 
| rowspan="2" colspan="1" style="background:black; color:white;" | 
| rowspan="2" style="background:white; color:black;" | N/A
| rowspan="2" style="width:150px; line-height:75%; " | 
|-
| colspan="12" style="background:yellow;" | PG
|-
! rowspan="3" style="text-align:left" |  Slovakia
| colspan="11"  style="background:white" |   
| rowspan="2" colspan="3" style="background:purple; color:white;" | 12
| rowspan="2" colspan="3" style="background:purple; color:white;" | 15
| rowspan="2" colspan="4" style="background:black; color:white;" | 18
| rowspan="3" colspan="1" style="background:white;" | N/A
| rowspan="3" style="width:150px; line-height:75%; " | 
|-
| colspan="6" style="background:white" | Unrated
| colspan="5" style="background:purple; color:white;" | 7
|-
| colspan="6" style="background:white;" || colspan="5" style="background:purple; color:white;" | 
| colspan="3" style="background:purple; color:white;" | 
| colspan="7" style="background:purple; color:white;"  | 
|-
! rowspan="3" style="text-align:left" |  Slovenia
| rowspan="3" colspan="11" style="background:yellow;" | VS
| rowspan="3" colspan="3" style="background:purple; color:white;" | 12
| rowspan="3" colspan="3" style="background:purple; color:white;" | 15
| colspan="4" style="background:purple; color:white;" | 18
| rowspan="3" style="background:white;" | N/A
| rowspan="3" style="background:white;" | 
|-
| colspan="4" style="background:black; color:white;" | 
|-
| colspan="4" style="background:black; color:white;" | 
|-
! style="text-align:left" |  South Africa
| colspan="5" style="background:white;" | All
| colspan="7" style="background:red; color:white;" | PG
| colspan="3" style="background:black; color:white;" | 13
| colspan="2" style="background:black; color:white;" | 16
| colspan="4" style="background:black; color:white;" | 18
| rowspan="1" style="background:white; color:black;" | N/A
| rowspan="1" style="width:150px; line-height:75%; " | 
|-
! style="text-align:left" |  South Korea
| colspan="6" style="background:white;" | ALL
| colspan="2" style="background:black; color:white;" | 7
| colspan="3" style="background:red; color:white;" | 7
| colspan="3" style="background:black; color:white;" | 12
| colspan="4" style="background:black; color:white;" | 15
| colspan="3" style="background:black; color:white;" | 19
| rowspan="1" style="background:white; color:black;" | Exempt
| rowspan="1" style="width:150px; line-height:75%; " | 
|-
! rowspan="2" style="text-align:left" |  Spain
| colspan="6" style="background:white;" |  
| rowspan="2" colspan="3" style="background:purple; color:white;" | 7
| rowspan="2" colspan="2" style="background:purple; color:white;" | 
| rowspan="2" colspan="1" style="background:purple; color:white;" | 12
| rowspan="2" colspan="3" style="background:purple; color:white;" | 
| rowspan="2" colspan="2" style="background:purple; color:white;" | 16
| rowspan="2" colspan="4" style="background:purple; color:white;" | 18
| rowspan="2" colspan="1" style="background:white; color:black;" | N/A
| rowspan="2" style="width:150px; line-height:75%; " | 
|-
| colspan="6" style="background:white; color:black;" | 
|-
! rowspan="2" style="text-align:left" |  Taiwan
| rowspan="2" colspan="5" style="background:white;" | 0+
| colspan="6" style="background:black; color:white;" | 6+
| colspan="3" style="background:red; color:white;" | 6+
| rowspan="2" colspan="3" style="background:black; color:white;" | 15+
| rowspan="2" colspan="4" style="background:black; color:white;" | 18+
| rowspan="2" style="background:white; color:black;" | N/A
| rowspan="2" style="width:150px; line-height:75%; " | N/A
|-
| colspan="6" style="background:white; color:black;" | N/A
| colspan="3" style="background:black; color:white;" | 12+
|-
! rowspan="2" style="text-align:left" |  Thailand
| colspan="12" style="background:white; color:black;" | General
| rowspan="2" colspan="5" style="background:red; color:white;" | PG 13
| rowspan="2" colspan="2" style="background:red; color:white;" | PG 18
| rowspan="2" colspan="2" style="background:black; color:white;" | 
| rowspan="2" style="background:white; color:black;" | N/A
| rowspan="2" style="width:150px; line-height:75%; " | 
|-
| colspan="5" style="background:white;" | 
| colspan="7" style="background:purple; color:white;" | 
|-
! style="text-align:left" |  Turkey
| colspan="6" style="background:white; color:black;" |  
| colspan="6" style="background:purple;color:white;" | 7+
| colspan="5" style="background:purple;color:white;" | 13+
| colspan="4" style="background:purple;color:white;" | 18+
| style="background:white; color:black;" |Exempt
| rowspan="1" style="width:150px; line-height:75%; " | 
|-
! style="text-align:left" |  Ukraine
| colspan="11" style="background:white;" | Unrated
| colspan="4" style="background:red; color:white;" | 12+
| colspan="2" style="background:red; color:white;" | 16+
| colspan="4" style="background:black; color:white;" | 18+
| rowspan="1" style="background:white; color:black;" | N/A
| rowspan="1" style="width:150px; line-height:75%; " | 
|-
! rowspan="3" style="text-align:left"  |  United States
| colspan="13" style="background:white;" | TV-G
| rowspan="3" colspan="3" style="background:purple; color:white" | TV-14
| rowspan="3" colspan="5" style="background:purple; color:white;" | TV-MA
| rowspan="3" style="background:white; color:black;" | N/A
| rowspan="3" style="width:150px; line-height:75%; " | 
|-
| colspan="13" style="background:yellow;" | TV-PG
|-
| colspan="6" style="background:white;" | 
| colspan="7" style="background:purple; color:white"  | (-FV)()
|-
! rowspan="2" style="text-align:left" |  Venezuela
| colspan="17" style="background:white;" | Todo usuario
| colspan="4" rowspan="2" style="background:black; color:white;" | Adulto
| rowspan="2" style="background:white; color:black;" | N/A
| rowspan="2" style="width:150px; line-height:75%;" | 
|-
| colspan="17" style="background:yellow; color:black;" |  Supervisado
|-
! Country/System !! 0/1 !! 2 !! 3 !! 4 !! 5 !! 6 !! 7 !! 8 !! 9 !! 10 !! 11 !! 12 !! 13 !! 14 !! 15 !! 16 !! 17 !! 18 !! 19 !! 20 !! 21 !!Other !!Time restrictions
|}

 Use 
 Argentina 

In Argentina, the content rating system is identical to those used by the local film bureau.
 Apto para todo público (ATP) – programmes may contain mild violence, language and mature situations;
 Apto para mayores de 13 años (SAM 13) – programmes may contain mild to moderate language and mild violence and sexual references;
 Apto para mayores de 16 años (SAM 16) – programmes may contain more intensive violence and coarse language, partial nudity and moderate sexual references;
 Apto para mayores de 18 años (SAM 18) – programmes contain graphic violence, coarse language and strong sexual references.

Starting from September 2010, it is compulsory for broadcasters to show the plaque Comienza el horario apto para todo público and Finaliza el horario apto para todo público at 6:00 a.m. or 7:00 a.m. and 10:00 p.m. or 10:30 p.m. respectively. In addition, the plaque Atención: Contenido no apto para niños, niñas y adolescentes is shown before news broadcasts.

 Armenia 

A television content rating system for Armenia was introduced in June 2006 (first tested in Yerevan in January 2006). Before a program airs, the voiceover must warn at the beginning of the program that it may not be suitable for all viewers. The notice must be at "M", "AO", and "A" ratings and last for at least 5 seconds, which reads, "The following program may not be suitable for those under 16/17/18 years of age. If an anime with the shōnen or shōjo genre is airing, it must be at ratings of "Y7", "T" and "M", "AO" and "A" and also lasting at least 5 seconds, which reads, "The following program may not be suitable for male/female audiences." Under the notice there should be such symbols indicating male and female gender. If shōnen, the symbol for Mars, if shōjo, the symbol for Venus. Armenian ratings should be displayed for 15 seconds at the beginning of the program and after leaving the commercial block. The Armenian ratings are as follows:

Range specific
 Y – suitable for ages 0–7;
 Y7 – suitable for ages 7 and up;
 GA – suitable for general audiences;
 TW – suitable for children ages 9 and up;
 T – suitable for children ages 12 and up;
 A – suitable only for adults ages 18 and up, it can be broadcast from 8:00 to 14:00 on weekends (from 9:00 to 15:00 on weekdays and from 22:00 to 6:00 daily for "Armenia TV") to 6:00 daily free-to-air (except for premium channels).

Age specific
 EC – suitable for ages 2 and up;
 E – suitable for ages 5 and up;
 E9 – suitable for ages 9 and up;
 T – suitable for ages 12 and up;
 M – suitable for ages 16 and up;
 AO – suitable for ages 17 and up.

Ratings are placed in the bottom left or bottom right corner of the screen. All Armenian broadcasters are required to show an "All Age Appropriate End Time" sign at 11:00 pm or 11:30 pm, respectively. In Armenia, each broadcaster must voluntarily show a disclaimer stating "The following program may not be suitable for those under 16/17/18 years of age" before broadcasting if the program contains potentially offensive, extreme or dangerous, scary and sexual content, scenes of violence, drug or alcohol abuse, discrimination, and profanity. Ratings of broadcast programs do not often trigger legal intervention, as radio and television authorities have stricter rules regarding age rating categories for programs. If a program is not marked with the rating symbol chosen by the TV authority, the broadcast channel often has to pay average fines to the Armenian authorities, except for 24-hour news channels, 24-hour advertising channels, pay-per-view channels or pay-per-view channels and foreign broadcast TV channels, which are subject to foreign audiovisual regulations of their country of origin.

On pay TV where content filtering is not available, programs classified as A can only be broadcast from 7:00 am to 7:00 am the next day and from 8:00 am to 8:00 pm on school days. If content filtering is available, A-rated programs can be broadcast at any time. Explicit adult sex programs classified as A can only be shown on premium channels and can aired on premium channels at any time. Ratings are not displayed during news programs, health programs, or during the airing of 24-hour news and advertising channels.

Descriptors must be displayed under a rating higher than "T". Up to 5 descriptors can be used. The descriptors are as follows:
 If a knife is drawn in the white square, the program contains scenes of violence.
 If the white square combines the symbols of Mars and Venus, the program contains sexual content.
 If the program contains drug or alcohol abuse, the white square with a marijuana leaf and a bottle can be recognized.
 If the program contains discrimination, you can recognize by the light gray square in which figures are drawn, of which two are black and the middle is white.
 If the black square contains a grid sign, an ampersand and an exclamation point, then the program contains profanity.
 A white square with a ghost figure warns of programming, including scary content.
 An orange rectangle with a motorcycle drawn on it warns of programming including extreme or dangerous content.

 Australia 

 Child-specific ratings 

 Standard ratings 

Classifications are intended to be equivalent to the Australian Classification Board (ACB) classifications of the same name. They're usually presented with the same shape and sometimes colour as their ACB counterparts.

Adult "Pay Per View" only

R 18+ and X 18+ restricted classifications are not permitted for free-to-air broadcast in Australia. Many R 18+ movies on DVD/Blu-ray are often edited on Free TV/cable networks, to secure an MA 15+ classification or lower. Some movies that were classified R 18+ on DVD have since been aired on Australian TV with an MA 15+ classification.

 Consumer advice 
Consumer advice is compulsory for all MA 15+ and one-off programmes, as well as very short series classified M or higher (such as feature films, miniseries and documentaries). When a programme carries consumer advice, appropriate abbreviations are displayed along with the classification symbol after each commercial break. In general, these abbreviations are as follows:

 A – used for programs with adult themes, medical procedures or crude humour.
 V – used for programs depicting violence;
 L – used for programs coarse language;
 S – used for programs depicting simulated sex scenes and/or references;
 H – used for programs containing horror or supernatural themes;
 D – used for programs with drug references and/or use;
 N – used for programs containing nudity;

For violence, coarse language and sex scenes, the intensity and/or frequency is mentioned in front of the consumer advice. These include: "mild", "stylised", "some", "frequent" or "strong". Example: "strong sex scenes".

 Brazil 

A television content rating system in Brazil was implemented following a consultation in 2006. Since then, the television networks themselves rate the shows, while the advisory rating judges the content to guarantee that the rating is appropriate for that specific show. On broadcast networks, where the system is mandatory, the ratings are also translated in Brazilian Sign Language, and may also carry content descriptors. The icons must be shown at the start of each block of the show, and their respective promos.

All rating is advisory unlike films. The Brazilian content rating system utilizes age-specific classifications (with the exception of L-rated programming), and consist of the following:
  L: Livre para todos os públicos – Content is suitable for all audiences
  10: Não recomendado para menores de 10 anos – Content suitable for viewers over the age of 10.
  12: Não recomendado para menores de 12 anos – Content suitable for viewers over the age of 12.
  14: Não recomendado para menores de 14 anos – Content suitable for viewers over the age of 14.
  16: Não recomendado para menores de 16 anos – Content suitable for viewers over the age of 16.
  18: Não recomendado para menores de 18 anos – Content suitable for viewers over the age of 18.

 Bulgaria 
All television stations show the rating during the broadcast in Bulgaria.
In the current system there are five rating categories:
 Unrated - can be viewed for each age
 12 - Content suitable for viewers over the age of 12.
 14 - Content suitable for viewers over the age of 14.
 16 - Content suitable for viewers over the age of 16.
 18 - Content suitable for viewers over the age of 18. (Not allowed before 23:00)

 Canada 

The Canadian TV Classification System was created in late 1997 for English-language programs to use, which lined up with those of the American v-chip, both matching that system and allowing television manufacturers to use the same backbone firmware for both systems. The upper-right corner of symbols are shaped like the corner of a maple leaf, as is used in the national flag, and are rendered in black and white. The icons are intended to be shown once an hour lasting 15 seconds, although in the case of longer programs that do not start on the hour, some broadcasters show the rating at the start and at the top of each subsequent clock hour, while others show the rating at the start and again precisely one hour later. However, there are some networks like Global that only display the television rating at the beginning of the show. The icons are displayed in the upper-left corner and the size is mandated to be a minimum of 52 scan lines or pixels tall, and must also fully cover an American ratings icon if burned-in or broadcast live by an American broadcaster.

Additionally, should a program contain content potentially unsuitable for some viewers, such as violence, coarse language, or nudity, members of the self-regulating Canadian Broadcast Standards Council (which does not include the CBC, although it still uses such warnings) are required to air a disclaimer at the beginning of the program and at the end of each commercial break, advising viewer discretion (such disclaimers are only required for the first hour if airing after 9:00 p.m.). This disclaimer is technically required even if the final commercial break comes immediately before the closing credits, and some (but not all) channels in fact observe this.

Notably, the television rating given may depend on the level of cable and satellite, or if the program is broadcast over-the-air. Also, television ratings are generally considered more restrictive than movie ratings.

 English-language ratings 

The Canadian rating system for English-language broadcasters (as well as third-language broadcasters, which broadcast in a language other than English or French) is as follows:
 Exempt – Programming that is exempt from ratings (such as news and sports programming) will not display an on-screen rating at all.
 C – Programming is intended for younger children under the age of 8 years. No offensive language or sexual content of any level allowed. Might contain occasional comedic, unrealistic depictions of violence.
 C8 – Intended for children ages 8+. Infrequent/mild violence and fantasy horror is allowed. No profanity is allowed, but occasional "socially offensive and discriminatory" language is allowed if in the context of the story. No sexual content of any level allowed.
 G – Intended for general audiences. Programming suitable for the entire family with minimal and infrequent violence. No profanity is allowed, but offensive slang is permitted. No sexual content.
 PG – Intended for general audiences, but may not be suitable for children under the age of 8. Moderate violence and infrequent/mild profanity is allowed. May contain brief nudity and sexual references if important to the context of the story. Some content may not be suitable for children under the age of 8 and parental supervision is recommended for children aged 8–13.
 14+ – Programming intended for viewers ages 14 and older. May contain intense violence and strong/frequent profanity. Might contain nudity and depictions of sexual activity as long as they are within the context of a story. Parents are strongly cautioned to exercise discretion in permitting viewing by pre-teens and early teens without parent/guardian supervision.
 18+ – Programming intended for viewers ages 18 and older. May contain explicit violence, graphic language, and explicit portrayals of sexual activity. Programming with this rating cannot air before the watershed (9:00 p.m. to 5:00 a.m.).

 French-language (Québécois) ratings 
French-language broadcasters use a rating system that is virtually identical to Quebec's Régie du cinéma's film rating system, with one additional category (8+):
 G: Général (general) – appropriate for all ages and must contain little or no violence and little to no sexual content.
 8+ ans – appropriate for children 8 and up may contain with little violence, language, and little to no sexual situations;
 13+ ans – suitable for children 13 and up and may contain with moderate violence, language, and some sexual situations;
 16+ ans – recommended for children over the age of 16 and may contain with strong violence, strong language, and strong sexual content;
 18+ ans – recommended to be viewed by adults and may contain extreme violence and graphic sexual content. It is mostly used for 18+ movies and pornography.
 An E rating (no rating will appear on screen) is given to exempt programming, in the same classes used for English-Canadian programming above.

 Chile 

The devised a content rating system in 1993.

 Child specific 
  I  Infantil (English: for children) – programmes suitable for all children;
  I7  Infantil para mayores de 7 años – programmes recommended for children ages 7 or older;
  I10  Infantil para mayores de 10 años – programmes recommended for children ages 10 or older;
  I12  Infantil para mayores de 12 años – programmes recommended for children and teens ages 12 or older.

 Standard ratings 
  F  Familiar (family) – programmes suitable for a general audience, with content appropriate for all ages;
  R  Responsabilidad compartida (shared responsibility) – programmes may have content not suitable for children under 12 not accompanied by an adult;
  A  Adulto (adult) – programmes suitable for adult audiences only (ages 18 or older), may contain coarse language, and sexual or explicit situations, access to these programmes is locked by a personal password.
Exhibition of programmes classified with the "A" rating is only allowed from 10 p.m. until 7 a.m. (both in local time); however, most channels only broadcast these programmes until they closedown their daily broadcasts (as they still don't begin permanent 24/7 services). All TV channels are required to show a warning (either as a full-screen identification or as a scrolling text message in a lower-third format, if shown during programming) when adult programming on the channel begins. The only exception to that rule applies to cable TV channels.

 Colombia 

Since 1997, Colombian television networks are required to specify programmes within dubbed family and adult fringes, and must display a notice signifying the audience, both visually and in narration, the minimum age required to watch the programme, if it contains sexual or violent content, and if parental company is needed at the beginning of every programme. The networks must also air an 'institutional message' daily at 21:00, inviting children 12 years of age or less to "not to stay exposed to contents which have no essentially child[-oriented] nature."Comisión Nacional de Televisión, Artículo 4o. Horario de Emisón cel Artículo Institucional – Acuerdo 4 de 1997 , 13 February 1997 A message must be broadcast at 22:10, Monday through Friday, (22:30 Saturdays and Sundays) stating to viewers that the adult fringe has started. Most networks opt to display a scrolling text message instead.

The ratings are as follows:
 Todos (all audiences) – daily, from the hours of 07:00–21:30;
 Infantil (children) – Monday through Friday from 16:00–17:00, and Saturdays and Sundays from 08:00–10:00;
 Familiar (family) – Monday to Friday from 07:00–16:00 and 17:00–22:10, and Saturdays and Sundays 07:00–08:00 and 10:00–22:30, respectively.
 Adultos (adult audiences) – Programming dubbed with this classification run through the remaining time slots not specified by the Infantil and Familiar fringes.

Pornography is prohibited from being transmitted over the air in Colombia, even in the adult fringes.

 Croatia 
In Croatia, television networks show the rating during the broadcast. The Hrvatska Radiotelevizija (Croatian Radiotelevision) channels, RTL Televizija, RTL 2, Nova TV and Doma TV all display warnings before a broadcast not meant for a general audience. Broadcasts meant for all audiences do not have a rating. With that in mind, the rating system is the following:

 12 - Content suitable for children of 12 years of age or older.
 15 - Content suitable for teens of 15 years of age or older.
 18 - Content suitable for adults of 18 years of age or older.

 Cyprus 
In Cyprus, television networks displays warnings before a broadcast not meant for a general audience. Broadcasts meant for all audiences do not have a rating. With that in mind, the rating system is the following:
 K - Content suitable for all viewers.
 12 - Content suitable for children of 12 years of age or older.
 15 - Content suitable for teens of 15 years of age or older.
 18 - Content suitable for adults of 18 years of age or older. (Broadcast allowed from 1:00 to 6:00)

 Czech Republic 

On Czech television, programmes with potentially shocking or harmful content could air only between 10:00pm and 6am and with a star-shaped marker on either corner of the screen indicating it was for adults.

 Denmark 

Since 1 September 2020, the Medierådet for Børn og Unge (Media Council for Children and Young People) classifies all programs and films for television broadcast and video on demand release, using the same rating also used for theatrically released films and home media releases. On television, the age limit must be informed orally before the program starts or continues. The clear rating should be shown during the entire transmission time or a minimum first five minutes, and must be available in program listings. Films and series on VOD services must have age ratings and mention the content in them that explains why the content was given its rating. The location of the rating is up to the individual provider as long as it is visible to the consumer before choosing a film or program. The new television classification system only applies to domestic television and VOD services such as DR, TV 2, TV3, Kanal 4 and Viaplay, and as such do not apply to foreign services such as Netflix, HBO Max or Disney+. The requirements apply to all programming outside of news & current affairs, music, sports, live telecasts, instructional & leisure programs, programming of nonprofit, political or religious nature, preface of programs and teaching & research programs.

The ratings are:
 A – Suitable for a general audience.
 7 – Not recommended for children under 7.
 11 – For ages 11 and up.
 15 – For ages 15 and up.

 Ecuador 

Article 65 of the Communications Law of Ecuador presents the following classification:
 A: Apto para todo público (Suitable for all age groups). It can be transmitted at any time, especially in the "FAMILIAR" (FAMILY), from 6:00 to 18:00.
 B: Apto para todo público, con vigilancia de una persona adulta (Suitable for all age groups, with supervision of an adult). Under 12 needs an adult. It can be transmitted at any time, especially in "RESPONSABILIDAD COMPARTIDA" (SHARED RESPONSIBILITY), from 18:00 to 22:00; but not during FAMILIAR.
 C: Apto solo para personas adultas (Suitable only for adults). It can be transmitted only during the hours of "ADULTOS" (ADULT), from 22:00 to 6:00.

The classification to which belongs each programme will be arranged by the Consejo de Regulación y Desarrollo de la Información y Comunicación (Regulatory and Development Council of Information and Communication) depending on the parameters which are considered relevant.

 El Salvador 
The Dirección de Espectáculos Públicos, Radio y Televisión (Direction of Public Shows, Radio and Television), entity attached to the Ministerio de Gobernación y Desarrollo Territorial (Ministry of Interior and Territorial Development), regulates the contents exhibited in Salvadoran television.
 A: Apto para todo público (Suitable for all age groups). It can be transmitted at any time.
 B: Apto para mayores de 12 años (Suitable for over 12 years). It can be transmitted at any time.
 C: Apto para mayores de 15 años (Suitable for over 15 years). It can be transmitted at any time.
 D: Apto para mayores de 18 años (Suitable for over 18 years). It can be transmitted at any time.
 E: Apto para mayores de 21 años (Suitable for over 21 years). It can be transmitted from 22:00 to 5:00.

 Finland 

A content rating system was introduced for Finnish television broadcasts in 2004. The initial ratings system for television programmes shown on Finnish television channels consists of the following:

 S – allowed at all times;
 K7 – not allowed air before 7:00 a.m., not recommended for children under 7;
 K12 – not allowed air before 5:00 p.m., not recommended for children under 12;
 K16 – not allowed air before 9:00 p.m., not recommended for children under 16;
 K18 – not allowed air before 11:00 p.m., not recommended for children under 18.
If a programme is classified as 'K16' or 'K18', a notification must be shown before broadcast.

 France 

A content rating system in French is regulated by the Conseil supérieur de l'audiovisuel (CSA). Each rating icon is translucent and, as of December 2012, is shown for the whole duration of the show.
 If no rating appears, it is most likely appropriate for all ages.
  Déconseillé aux moins de 10 ans (English: not recommended for children under 10) – not allowed in children's television series;
  Déconseillé aux moins de 12 ans (English: not recommended for children under 12) – not allowed air before 10:00 p.m. (some channels and programs are subject to exception);
  Déconseillé aux moins de 16 ans (English: not recommended for children under 16) – not allowed air before 10:30 p.m. (some channels and programs are subject to exception);
  Déconseillé aux moins de 18 ans (English: not recommended for persons under 18) – allowed only between midnight and 5 a.m.

There initially was no ratings system for French television. In March 1961, following the broadcast of a film where a female nude was briefly visible, the "white square" was introduced. A white square, replaced by a white rectangle in 1964, was displayed in the corner of the screen. An off-screen voice warned at the beginning of the program that it was unsuitable for all audiences. This system continued until 1996 when the Conseil supérieur de l'audiovisuel replaced it with a system of five pictograms, indicating the suitability of the program. This system was replaced by the current system on 18 November 2002.

 Germany 

In Germany, every broadcaster has to show a disclaimer displaying the sentence Die nachfolgende Sendung ist für Zuschauer unter 16/18 Jahren nicht geeignet before transmission if the programme contains potentially offensive content. This roughly translates to The following programme is not suitable for viewers under 16/18. The Freiwillige Selbstkontrolle Fernsehen (FSF) checks many shows in private television.
FSK 0 - For all ages.
FSK 6 - For ages 6 and up.
FSK 12 - For ages 12 and up.
FSK 16 - For ages 16 and up, can only be broadcast between 22:00 and 06:00.
FSK 18 - For adults only, can only be broadcast between 23:00 and 06:00, may contain explicit content.

 Greece 

A new content rating system in Greece was introduced on 30 September 2019. The system is now associated with the age of viewers and has new visual symbols (replacing rhombus, circle, triangle, square and cross symbols), however, there are no mature-accompanied ratings compared to the previous system. The ratings are compulsory and are displayed and verbally announced at the beginning of each broadcast. These provisions are enforced by the Greek National Council for Radio and Television (ESR).
  – suitable for all ages
  – suitable for ages 8 and up (allowed only 30 minutes after the kid-friendly zone)
  – suitable for ages 12 and up (allowed only between 9:30 p.m. and 6:00 a.m., or between 10:00 p.m. and 6:00 a.m. during Fridays, Saturdays and school holidays)
  – suitable for ages 16 and up (allowed only between 11:00 p.m. and 6:00 a.m.)
  – suitable for ages 18 and up (allowed only between 1:00 a.m. and 6:00 a.m.)

Also, programmes suitable for ages 12 and up will be accompanied by a special word marker identifying their content, which is divided into the following four categories:
 ΒΙΑ (English: VIOLENCE): The programme contains scenes of violence.
 ΣΕΞ (English: SEX): The programme contains sex scenes.
 ΧΡΗΣΗ ΟΥΣΙΩΝ (English: USE OF SUBSTANCES): The programme contains scenes of drug use and other addictive substances.
 ΑΚΑΤΑΛΛΗΛΗ ΦΡΑΣΕΟΛΟΓΙΑ (English: INAPPROPRIATE LANGUAGE): The programme contains inappropriate language.

 Hong Kong 

The Hong Kong television rating system is since by generic code of television programmes standard of the Broadcasting Ordinance (Cap.562) on 11 December 1995. The current ratings are:
 If no rating appears, it is for general audiences. 
 PG (parental guidance recommended) – programmes are unsuitable for children, parental guidance is recommended; programmes that are classified as 'PG' should not be broadcast between 4:00 p.m. and 8:30 p.m. every day, as this is a watershed devised for family viewing. 
 M (mature) – programmes are recommended for adult viewers above the age of 18, only allowed to be shown between 11:00 p.m. and 6:00 a.m.

 Hungary 

The Hungarian content rating system has changed frequently. The ratings of the programmes broadcast often caused legal interferences, since the radio and television authorities have stricter guidelines about age appropriate rating categories for programs. If a programme is not marked with the television authority's choice of rating symbol, the airing channel often has to pay large penalties to Hungarian authorities. Broadcasters licensed in another country may have a different rating system than the one used in Hungary, or have no ratings. For example, Discovery Communications' channels used Dutch ratings, TV2's sister channels, DIGI's self-packaged educational channels, and before 2015, RTL Klub's sister channels all used the Romanian ratings, while ViacomCBS' Hungarian TV channels (such as Comedy Central, Comedy Central Family, and the Paramount Network) had no ratings although before airing a show not suitable for children, a channel will show a full-screen voiced-over slide and have a star-like icon in the top-right corner for a whole duration of a show. AMC's channels do the similar thing as ViacomCBS did. International broadcasters also do not have ratings.

The earliest symbolic classification system was first used by the now-defunct TV channel, Msat in the late-1990s. These ratings is applicable only for films shown on TV. After Msat was shut down, commercial broadcaster TV2 have used that system while the public broadcaster MTV and commercial broadcaster RTL Klub (in addition to TV2's system) had used full-screen voiced-over slides before films, similar in function to the system used by TV2. These symbols are shown for a minute after a film had started, although in TV2, these symbols had also shown for a few seconds before the film begins.

The earliest classification symbols are:

 ●(RTL Klub only) - films is recommended for children with the parental guidance.
 ▲(for both RTL Klub and TV2) - films not recommended for children below the age of 14.
 ■(for RTL Klub) or ●(for TV2) - the film is suitable only for adult viewers (for ages 18 and up).

In 2002, a new rating system was devised, replacing the symbolic system. Ranking programmes and displaying the rating symbols became compulsory on every Hungarian television network. The new rating system caused trouble within these networks because the channels were required to display the ranking symbols during the entire duration of their programmes. The symbols were distracting to viewers, and networks feared that their constant presence could damage the television screen. Due to the complaints, the television authority allowed channels to choose to show the rating symbols on the left or on the right side of the screen. Later, channels were also allowed to increase the transparency of the symbols.

In the system used between 2002 and 2010, there are four rating categories:

  Unrated – programmes can be viewed by any age, also used for content exempt from classification such as sporting events
  12 – programmes recommended for children below the age of 12 with parental guidance, may contain light sexual content or explicit language. Most films without serious violence or sexual content fit into this category as well. It can air at any time  16 – programmes not recommended for teens and children below the age of 16, may contain more intensive violence and sexual content. May only air from 9 PM to 6 AM.  18 – the programme is recommended for adult viewers (for ages 18 and up), may contain explicit violence and explicit sexual content. May only air from 10 PM to 5 AM.The rating system was overhauled in 2010 by introducing the new classifications: the 6 rating and the optional GY rating, changing the 12 classification and renewing the looks of the symbols themselves.

In the current system, there are five rating categories:
 Unrated – programmes can be viewed by any age, also used for content exempt from classification such as sporting events
  children friendly – programmes recommended for children. It is an optional rating, there is no obligation for broadcasters to indicate it. May not air between two programmes with higher classifications, for example, between two programmes rated 6+ or rated 12+. The green kid's face is used for that rating. This rating was retired in 2017 but was reintroduced in 2021.
  6 – programmes not recommended for children below the age of 6, may contain mild violence in a cartoony setting, but no sexual content or profanity. May not air between two programmes with higher classifications. A yellow circle with the number 6 written inside is used for this rating;
  12 – programmes not recommended for children below the age of 12, may contain light sexual content or mild to moderate use of profanity. Most films without serious violence or sexual content fit into this category as well. May not air between two programmes with lower classifications, for example, two programmes rated 6+ or without ratings. A yellow circle with the number 12 written inside is used for this rating;
  16 – programmes not recommended for teens and children below the age of 16, may contain more intensive violence and sexual content, as well as references to illegal drugs such as cocaine and heroin. Strong language can be used in this category as well. May only air from 9 PM to 6 AM. A yellow circle with the number 16 written inside is used for this rating;
  18 – the programmes is recommended for adult viewers (for ages 18 and up), may contain explicit violence, explicit sexual content and since 2021, content considered "homosexual propaganda". May only air from 10 PM to 5 AM. A red circle with the number 18 written inside is used for this rating.

Similar ratings also apply to films shown in cinemas, however unlike in other countries a viewer cannot be denied access from entering a screening if they are not the age of the rating.

Since July 8, 2021, because of the hungarian LGBT-law, several Hungarian channels - just like RTL Klub and TV2 - have also began to use these ratings on their commercial breaks.

There was also formerly an X rating: however, due to a law change on October 1, 2022, X-rated content can no longer be aired on Hungarian television. One notably X-rated film is Lewis. Before an X-rated film, the following must be said:
.

 India 

In February 2013, in the wake of controversy over suspension of exhibition of the film Vishwaroopam, the Ministry of Information & Broadcasting constituted a panel under the Chairmanship of Justice (Retd.) Mukul Mudgal to examine issues of film certification under the Cinematograph Act 1952. One of the terms of reference for the committee is to examine "the requirement of special categories of certification for the purposes of broadcasting on television channels and radio stations." But, the committee had not made any recommendations on this important matter.

The current classifications of films in India are as follows:
 अ / U – unrestricted public exhibition;
 अ/व / U/A – unrestricted public exhibition, but with a caution regarding parental guidance to those under 12 years of age;
 व / A – public exhibition restricted to adults 18 years of age and older only;
 S – public exhibition restricted to members of a profession or a class of persons (e.g. doctors etc.)—very rare.

 Indonesia 

The Indonesian Broadcasting Commission (KPI) regulate broadcast television content that classifies television programme into several classifications:
 SU - Semua Umur (English: all ages) – suitable for general audiences over the age of 2 years;
 P - Prasekolah (English: pre-school) – suitable for pre-school children from ages 2 through 6;
 A - Anak (English: children) – suitable for children from ages 7 through 12;
 R - Remaja (English: teenager) – suitable for teens from ages 13 through 17;
 BO - Bimbingan Orangtua (English: parental control/guidance) – suitable for children or teens with parental control, but this classification does not stand alone and accompanied the P, A and R ratings, become:
 P-BO – suitable for pre-school children from ages 2 through 6 with guidance of parents
 A-BO – suitable for children from ages 7 through 12 with guidance of parents
 R-BO – suitable for teens from ages 13 through 17 with guidance of parents;
 D - Dewasa (English: mature) – suitable for viewers over 18 and older. Programmes with this rating are aired from 10.00 PM to 03.00 AM.

 Israel 
 G: General Audiences. Anyone, regardless of age, can watch the programme.
 12+: Suitable for children 12 and over only.
 15+: Suitable for teens 15 and over only.
 18+: Suitable for adults 18 and over only.
 E: Exempt from classification. This rating is usually applied to live broadcasts.

 Italy 

Italy has no unified classification for TV content. The classification system changes according to each station and is not legally binding. The first group to introduce the TV rating system was Mediaset in 1994, initially only on Canale 5. Italia 1 and Rete 4 adopted the rating system in 1997, while the thematic channels adopted it in 2009. Given the simplicity of the classification system, inspired by traffic lights, the other broadcasters also followed the example of Mediaset. The ratings adopted by Mediaset are the following:

  Bollino verde (Green label) – Suitable for all ages.
   Bollino giallo (Yellow label) – Parental guidance suggested.
   Bollino rosso (Red label) – Suitable for adults.

Programmes with the red label can be blocked by parental control.

RAI introduced the TV rating system in October 2000, with a flashing red logo to indicate programmes that are suitable only for adults. In 2007 the classification system was expanded with new logos: red if the program is suitable only for adults and yellow if the parental guidance is suggested for  children.

The classifications used by Sky Italia are instead the following:
 T – All ages admitted.
 BA – Parental guidance suggested.
 VM12 – Not recommended for children under 12.
 VM14 – Not recommended for children under 14.
 VM18 – Not recommended for children under 18.

Programmes can be blocked by parental control.

 Lithuania 

All television stations show the rating during the broadcast in Lithuania.

Broadcasts meant for all audiences do not have a rating.

With that in mind, the rating system is the following:

 N-7 - Content suitable for children of 7 years of age or older.
 N-14 - Content suitable for teens of 14 years of age or older.
 S - Content suitable for adults of 18 years of age or older.

 Malaysia 

In Malaysia, a television rating system was revised in January 2012. Ratings are shown before the programme starts.

The classifications are as follows:
 U – No age limit. Can be broadcast anytime.
 P13 - Viewers under 13 years of age need parental/guardian supervision while viewing. Can be broadcast anytime, but some elements may only be broadcast at night.
 18 – For viewers 18 and above. Cannot be broadcast before 10:00 PM.
Ratings has been revised once again starting February 2023. The P13 rating has been elaborated further with 3 new ratings, which is P12, 13, and 16. The television rating system was as follows:

 U – No age limit. Can be broadcast anytime.
 P12 – Viewers under 12 years of age need parental/guardian supervision while viewing.
 13 – For viewers 13 and above.
 16 – For viewers 16 and above.
 18 – For viewers 18 and above. Cannot be broadcast before 10:00 PM.

*Ratings P12, 13, and 16, can be broadcast anytime, but some elements may only be broadcast at night.

 Mexico 

The classification system of television programmes in Mexico is almost equivalent to that of the movie rating system of the country, and consists of the following:
 AA – aimed at children (can be broadcast anytime);
 A – appropriate for all ages;
 B – designed for ages 12 and older (allowed only between 16:00 and 05:59);
 B-15 – designed for ages 15 and up (allowed only between 19:00 and 05:59);
 C – designed to be viewed by adults aged 18 or older (allowed only between 21:00 and 05:59);
 D – exclusively for adults aged 18 or older (allowed only between midnight and 05:00);

 Morocco 
The classification system of television programmes in Morocco is established by the HACA. There are 4 categories. Before the airing of the program, an off-screen voice warned at the beginning of the programme that it was unsuitable for all audiences.

 Netherlands 

The television rating system in the Netherlands was created in 2001 by the Dutch Institute for the Classification of Audiovisual Media (NICAM) and is known as Kijkwijzer (ViewingGuide or WatchWiser). The same rating systems are used for both television programmes and films, and serve partly as guidelines (Programmes with the classification 12, 14 and 16 years may only be broadcast from 8pm and with the classification 18 years from midnight. Cinemas and theaters in the country cannot provide films with the classification 16 years to people under the age of 16). They are the same as Dutch film ratings.

The following age ratings apply:
  – All Ages (Alle leeftijden)
  – Watch out with children under 6 (Let op met kinderen tot 6 jaar)
  – Watch out with children under 9 (Let op met kinderen tot 9 jaar)
  – Watch out with children under 12 (Let op met kinderen tot 12 jaar)
  – Watch out with children under 14 (Let op met kinderen tot 14 jaar)
  – Watch out with children under 16 (Let op met kinderen tot 16 jaar)
  – Watch out with children under 18 (Let op met kinderen tot 18 jaar)

There are also six descriptor icons used:
 Violence (Geweld)
 Fear (Angst)
 Sex (Seks)
 Discrimination (Discriminatie)
 Drugs and/or alcohol abuse (Drugs- en/of alcoholmisbruik)
 Coarse Language (Grof taalgebruik)

 New Zealand 

On 1 May 2020, New Zealand realigned its television content rating system to a common system for free-to-air television, subscription television and on-demand services:

 G: Approved for general viewing (this was unchanged from the previous rating system).
 PG: Parental Guidance recommended for younger viewers (previously known as PGR, Parental Guidance Recommended).
 M: Suitable for mature audiences 16 years and over.
 16: People under 16 years should not view.
 18: People under 18 years should not view.
The last three ratings replaced the former AO (Adults Only) classification.

On free-to-air television, programmes classified M can be broadcast between 9.00am and 3.00pm on weekdays (school term time only, as designated by the Ministry of Education) and from 7.30pm until 5.00am on a daily basis. Programmes classified 16 can only be broadcast after the 8.30pm watershed, while programmes classified 18 can only be broadcast after 9.30pm.

On pay television, where content filtering is not available, programmes classified 18 can only be broadcast between 8.00pm and 6.00am on a daily basis and from 9.00am until 3.00pm on weekdays (school term time only). If content filtering is available, programmes classified 18 can be broadcast at any time. Explicit adult sex programmes classified 18 may screen only on premium channels.

The following descriptor codes (audience advisories) may be added for programmes classified PG or higher:

 C: Content may offend
 L: Language may offend
 V: Contains violence
 S: Sexual content may offend

 North Macedonia 
North Macedonia uses these symbols for each programming. Broadcasts meant for all audiences do not have a rating.
With that in mind, the rating system is the following:
● - Programme can be watched for each age
● - Programmes not recommended for children below the age of 8 (parental supervision recommended under this age).
■ - Programmes not recommended for children below the age of 12 (parental supervision recommended under this age). Only broadcast between 20:00 to 5:00.
▲ - Programmes not recommended for children below the age of 16 (parental supervision required under this age).  Only broadcast between 22:00 to 5:00.
X - Programmes not suitable for audiences under 18 years of age. Only broadcast between 0:00 to 5:00.

The symbols are put in the lower-left or lower right corner on screen.

 Norway 
A television content rating system was introduced in Norway in July 2015. Television broadcasters are obliged to classify their programmes in the following age categories: A (all ages), 6 years, 9 years, 12 years, 15 years or 18 years. The classification must be based on the guidelines made by The Norwegian Media Authority. Programmes in the different age categories must be transmitted according to the following time schedule during the day:
    – allowed at all times
  - only allowed during the period 19.00 – 05.30
   – only allowed during the period 21.00 – 05.30

Television broadcasters shall specify the age limit acoustically before the programme starts or clearly mark the programme with an age limit throughout its duration. Television broadcasters shall also specify the age limit in programme schedules and electronic programme guides.

The age categories are also applicable to other platforms such as Video on demand-services, videogrammes (DVD, Blu-ray) and cinema theatres.

 Peru 

The age rating system in Peru was introduced in 2005 by the then-President Alejandro Toledo and came into force for both radio and television broadcasts. Currently, the only free-to-air channels advising their audiences about the rating system are ATV, NexTV and La Tele, since most channels adopted their own system since 2009, starting with América Televisión.

The ratings for television programmes are available on some Peruvian channels. The rating system used in Peru is listed below.

 Philippines 

In the Philippines, the Movie and Television Review and Classification Board, commonly known as MTRCB, implements and regulates local television content rating systems. In 1979, it only had implemented two television ratings: "General Viewership" (GV) later renamed (General Patronage/GP) in 1995 and "Parental Guidance" (PG), in the mid-1990s up until from now on, some advisories are simply written on the upper left side or at the lower right side of the television screen.

On 6 October 2011, in order to encourage parents to supervise and be responsible with their children in watching television, the MTRCB revamped its rating system, implementing a three-tiered system:

The new ratings was originally to have been a four-tiered system, composed of G (General Patronage), PG (Parental Guidance), SPG (Strong Parental Guidance), and M, but some time before the implementation of the new system, the "M" rating was dropped.

The new ratings system is similar to the old one, but the look and the ratings themselves was completely revamped. All of these were only been implemented on Free to-Air Television stations. The new system consists of a new full-screen advisory of the programme's rating which is played before each programme, whatever the rating of such programme is, except in the case of programmes with SPG rating, wherein the rating must be aired twice (before the start of the programme and after each commercial break. e.g. in the middle part of the programme). A rating logo then appears at the bottom right of the screen during a programme if it was rated as such. Sometimes, when annotations are to be put and it takes the place of the logo, then it has to be put on the upper left side of the screen, opposite the logo of the TV station.

On 9 February 2012, the SPG rating was implemented, which utilizes at least one of the following content descriptors:
 T for tema (themes);
 L for lengguwahe (language);
 K for karahasan (violence); {V is also used for programs in foreign language}
S for sekswal (sex);
H for horror; and
D for droga (drugs);

The SPG rating was first broadcast on the film Cinco which was aired in ABS-CBN, where it had its old advisory.

 Poland 

Before 2000, Poland did not have any uniform classification system for television programmes. Some stations, however, applied their own system of signs: in front of the selected films TVP board applied the "Adult only" or "Film for adult audiences only". In Canal+ before the film to show in chart with key Canal+ in the appropriate colour (green, yellow, red). Until 27 February 2000, TVN decided to mark the so-called "adult movies" with a pulsating red 18+ logo. On 1 March 2000, an agreement was reached with Polish television broadcasters as "Friendly media" in order to introduce a uniform system of classification of television programmes. Nine television broadcasters - TVP, Polsat, TVN, Nasza TV, Canal+, Wizja TV, Polish Cable Television and TV Niepokalanow - had signed the agreement.

The current Polish television rating system was introduced on 15 August 2005 and consists of five icons. The icons need to be broadcast which threw the entire duration of the programme. On 28 August 2011 changed the appearance of the characters:

 Portugal 

For a long time, the only existing regulation on Portuguese television was that programmes with potentially shocking or harmful content could air only between 10:30pm and 6am and with a red circular marker on the top-right corner of the screen indicating it was for audiences aged 16 and over.

In 2006, all free-to-air networks decided to complement this rule with a shared, more detailed rating system for TV shows:
  Todos (suitable for all)
  10, Acompanhamento Parental (for spectators aged 10 or over; parental guidance required for children under 10)
  12, Acompanhamento Parental (for spectators aged 12 or over; parental guidance required for children under 12)
  16 (for spectators aged 16 or over; not suitable for children)

These logos must be shown during 10 seconds in the beginning of any programme and after every break. If a programme is rated 16, it can only be broadcast between 10:30pm and 6am. However, most cable channels in Portugal use the Spanish classification system.

 Republic of Moldova 

In the Republic of Moldova, the rating system is identical to the one used in Romania, as follows:

 Unrated – programmes can be viewed by any age
 AP – programmes are recommended for children with parental guidance, may not contain any violence or sexual content.
 12 or 12+ – programmes not recommended for children below the age of 12, may contain light sexual content or explicit language. Most films without serious violence or sexual content fit into this category as well. May only air from 8 PM to 6 AM. 15 or 15+  – programmes not recommended for teens and children below the age of 15, may contain more intensive violence and sexual content. May only air from 10 PM to 5 AM. 18 or 18+ – the programme is recommended for adult viewers (for ages 18 and up), may contain explicit violence and explicit sexual content. May only air from 11 PM to 5 AM. Romania 

The Romanian content rating system has changed frequently. The ratings of the programmes broadcast often caused legal interferences, since the radio and television authorities have stricter guidelines about age appropriate rating categories for programs. If a programme is not marked with the television authority's choice of rating symbol, the airing channel often has to pay large penalties to Romanian authorities, except with 24h all-news channels, 24h advertising channels (teleshopping), pay television or pay-per-view channels (like Eurosport, HBO, etc.) and foreign broadcasting TV-channels (like TV5Monde, Deutsche Welle, arte, etc.) that are subjected to foreign audio-visual regulations from their country of origin.

The first rating symbols were adopted on May 2, 2000, as follows:
 Unrated – programmes can be viewed by any age.
 ● - programmes are recommended with the parental guidance, may not contain any violence or sexual content.
 ▲ - programmes not recommended for children below the age of 12.
 ■ - the programme is recommended for adult viewers (for ages 18 and up), may contain explicit violence and explicit sexual content. May only air from 11 PM to 5 AM.Few television networks (such as Antena 1 or Prima TV) used the same symbols, but in a green, yellow or red ring with a transparent symbol.

In 2002, a new rating system was devised. Ranking programmes and displaying the rating symbols became compulsory on every Romanian television network. The new rating system caused trouble within these networks, because the channels were required to display the ranking symbols during the entire duration of their programmes. The symbols were distracting to viewers, and networks feared that their constant presence could damage the television screen. Due to the complaints, the television authority allowed channels to choose to show the rating symbols on the left or on the right side of the screen. Later, channels were also allowed to increase the transparency of the symbols.

The current rating symbols were adopted in September 2002. On July 12, 2005, the symbols became transparent.
In this system, the rating symbols are as follows:
 Unrated – programmes can be viewed by any age (generally news TV-programmes, mostly 24h news channels, reportages and documentaries with some exceptions. Most offensive and sensitive contents are censored during newscasts, exceptions are made when they are broadcast live and therefore sanctioned by the CNA) ;
 AP – programmes are recommended for children with parental guidance, may not contain any violence or sexual content. A white ring with a transparent circle with the font AP written inside is used for this rating. Until 2005, the symbol was put in a red circle.
 12  – programmes not recommended for children below the age of 12, may contain light sexual content or explicit language. Most films without serious violence or sexual content fit into this category as well. May only air from 8 PM to 6 AM.  A white ring with a transparent circle with the number 12 written inside is used for this rating. Until 2005, the symbol was put in a red circle.
 15  – programmes not recommended for teens and children below the age of 15, may contain more intensive violence and sexual content. May only air from 10 PM to 5 AM. A white ring with a transparent circle with the number 15 written inside is used for this rating. (Until 2005, the symbol was put in a red circle, and the classification was 16. The 16 rating was replaced by 15 on April 3, 2006, for a short time it was used with a white ring and transparent circle.)
 18  – the programme is recommended for adult viewers (for ages 18 and up), may contain explicit violence and explicit sexual content. May only air from 11 PM to 5 AM. A white ring with a transparent circle with the number 18 written inside is used for this rating. Until 2005, the symbol was put in a red circle.

 Russia 

The rating system for programmes and films shown on Russian television:
 0+ (Suitable for all ages)
 6+ (May not be suitable for very young children)
 12+ (Intended for viewers over the age of 12)
 16+ (Intended for viewers over the age of 16)
 18+ (Unsuitable for children, only for adults)
These logos are shown in the beginning of the programme and after every break.

 Singapore 

Singapore has adopted the use of TV Ratings from 21 October 2011. They consist of PG and PG13 ratings for Free-to-Air TV and NC16 and M18 ratings in addition to the PG and PG13 ratings for Pay TV channels. For Free-to-Air TV, the shows rated PG may be aired anytime while PG13 should air between 10pm to 6am. For Pay TV, PG13 rated programmes can be shown anytime. Before the rated programme starts the TV channels will show a notification. From now on, only StarHub TV's and Singtel TV's self-packaged non-regional Pay TV channels ( e.g. StarHub TV's E City and Sensasi and Singtel TV's FashionTV HD and FashionTV HD on Demand, both of which features modeling nudity in certain programmes ) are enabled to carry NC16 and M18 rated content. FashionTV is also Singapore's first official M18 rated channel. M18 rated programmes can only be telecasted from 10pm onwards to 6am on Pay TV. Regional channels like Fox Life, Fox Movies and HBO Asia are unable to carry Media Development Authority's film ratings as they are targeted at the same region (a certain group of Asia territories), which results in programmes being subjected to external censorship of a much harsher nature outside Singapore territorial control. Only Video on Demand (VOD) Pay TV services are allowed to carry R21 content currently. G-rated programmes are not required to show a notification for any channel.

 Slovakia 

Slovakian government accepted a law in 2001 (updated in 2007), in which television stations are required to display one of the following icons during all the program and in promos:
  7 – Content suitable for children over 7 years
  12 – Content suitable for children over 12 years
  15 – Content suitable for teens over 15 years, this program may only be broadcast from 8:00 pm to 6:00 am
  18 – Content exclusively for adults, this program may only be broadcast from 10:00 pm to 6:00 am
  Children's programming – Content created primarily for children up to 12 years
Additional icons used only for educational content:
  -7 – Educational content suitable for children up to 7 years
  7+ – Educational content suitable for children over 7 years
  12+ – Educational content suitable for children over 12 years
  15+ – Educational content suitable for teens over 15 years, this program may only be broadcast from 8:00 pm to 6:00 am

For content suitable for all children, a green  "U" icon is available, but broadcasters are not required to use it. Programming suitable for all ages doesn't show a rating at all.
Until 2007, all ratings went with faces: green smiley face - all viewers; orange sad face - suitable for 7, 12, 15 years and over; red very sad face - suitable for adults only.

 Slovenia 

Slovenian government accepted a law in 2004, in which television stations are required to play a voiceover and age icon warning, which has to be at least 10 seconds long before programmes, inappropriate for some audiences begin. Additionally, one of the following icons (a white rhombus with the age number) has to be displayed for the duration of the programme:

 VS (vodstvo staršev) – Parental guidance suggested for children under 12.
 12 – Content suitable for children over the age of 12.
 15 – Content suitable for teens over the age of 15.
 18 – Content suitable for adults.
 18+ – Explicit sexual content, not allowed free-to-air (pay-TV only).
 18++ – Pornographic content/programmes with severe violence scenes, not allowed free-to-air (pay-TV only)

The original content rating icons (used before 2014) were a red triangle with a stylised eye for content rated +15, while adult-only content used a red circle with a stylised eye.

Sometimes, age rating symbols are accompanied by additional symbols, which are not shown on-screen and warn the audience of the type of inappropriate content:

 Violent content can be recognised by a white rhombus, containing two stick figures. One is laying on the floor while being beaten up by the other with a baseball bat.
 Scary content contains a white rhombus with a stylised grey ghost figure.
 Sexual content is recognised by a white rhombus, containing conjoined male and female sex symbols (circle with a cross, pointing downwards and a circle with an arrow, pointing upwards).
 Programmes, containing dangerous scenes are equipped with a white rhombus, containing a crouching stick figure, trying to jump over a fence and an open fire.
 If a programme includes discriminative scenes, a white rhombus, containing three stick figures, of which the middle one is white, while the other two are black is shown.
 A white rhombus, containing a bottle, defaced with a stylised face warns of programming including drug and/or alcohol abuse scenes.
 If there is usage of inappropriate or strong language in a show, a white rhombus, containing a speech bubble with a hash sign, ampersand ("and" sign) and an exclamation mark is seen.

Programmes, appropriate for all audiences do not have a rating.

The public broadcaster RTV Slovenija and most other broadcasters use three watersheds. 12+ rated content is shown between 8 PM and 5 AM, 15+ rated programmes are allowed between 10 PM and 5 AM, and adult-only content can be shown between midnight and 5 AM. Cartoons and children's programmes are screened until 7 PM.

 South Africa 

South African ratings are issued and certified by the Film and Publication Board, whilst the National Broadcasting Commission regulates the various films and programmes. All television stations, cinemas and distributors of DVD, video and computer games must display the following signage:
  All: This is a programme/film that does not contain any obscenity, and is suitable for family viewing. A logo must be displayed in the corner of the screen for 30 seconds after each commercial break.
  PG: Children under 6 may watch this programme/film, but must be accompanied by an adult. This program contains an adult related theme, which might include very mild language, violence and sexual innuendo. A logo must be displayed in the corner of the screen for one minute after each commercial break.
  13: Children under 13 are prohibited from watching this programme/film. This programme contains mild language, violence and sexual innuendo. A logo must be displayed in the corner of the screen for two minutes after each commercial break.
  16: Children under 16 are prohibited from watching this programme/film. It contains moderate violence, language, and some sexual situations. In the case of television, this programme may only be broadcast after 9pm–4:30am. A logo must be displayed in the corner of the screen for five minutes after each commercial break. A full-screen warning must be issued before the start of the programme. If the programme is longer than an hour, a warning must be displayed every half an hour.
  18: Children under 18 are prohibited from watching this programme/film. It contains extreme violence, language and/or graphic sexual content. In the case of television, this program may only be broadcast from 10pm–4:30am. A logo must be displayed in the corner of the screen for the duration of the programme. A full-screen warning must be issued before the start of the programme and after each commercial break.
  X18: this is reserved for films of an extreme sexual nature (pornography). X18 films may only be distributed in the form of video and DVD in a controlled environment (e.g. adult shops). No public viewing of this film may take place. X18 films may not be broadcast on television and in cinemas. This has been breached twice by e.tv, where the softcore (borderline hardcore) Emmanuelle was screened. The X18 rating does not refer to child pornography/child sexual abuse—due to being banned by the Film and Publication Board.

Additional symbols:
  D (Drugs)
  V (Violence)
  N (Nudity)
  P (Prejudice)
  S (Sexual Activity)
  SV (Sexual Violence)
  L (Language)

 South Korea 

The South Korean television rating system has been in force since 2000, and it started with only four classifications which are All, 7, 13 and 19. In February 2001, all programs except domestic dramas (which had been enforced since November 2002) has required to have a rating system. In 2007, rating 13 was changed into 12 and a new rating, 15 is introduced. Most programmes have to be rated, except the "exempt" rating below. Even if it qualifies for being exempt, a broadcaster may apply a rating.

  All (Modeun yeollyeong sicheongga): This rating is for programming that is appropriate for all ages. Television programmes with this rating may contain some violence and/or some mild language. No adult content is allowed.
  7 (Chilse isang sicheongga): Children under 7 are prohibited from watching this programme/film. Children aged 7–8 may watch this programme/film, but must be accompanied by an adult. Television programmes with this rating can contain mild violence, mild language and few romance.
  12 (Sibise isang sicheongga): Children under 12 are prohibited from watching this programme/film. Television programmes with this rating may contain horror, some fantasy violence, some sexual content, little use of strong language, mild blood, and/or mild suggestive themes.
  15 (Sibose isang sicheongga): Children under 15 are prohibited from watching this programme/film. TV shows with this rating may contain use of alcohol, more sexual content, mild violence or little strong violence, major blood or gore, and/or suggestive themes.
  19 (Sipguse isang sicheongga): Children under 19 are prohibited from watching this programme/film. 19-rated programming is banned from airing during the hours of 7:00AM to 9:00AM, and 1:00PM to 10:00PM. (7:00 AM to 10:00 PM on Weekends and Public Holidays Only) Programmes that receive this rating will almost certainly have adult themes, sexual situations, strong language and disturbing scenes of violence.
 Exempt (no icon or name): This rating is only for knowledge based game shows; lifestyle shows; documentary shows; news; current topic discussion shows; education/culture shows; sports that excludes MMA or other violent sports; and other programmes that the Korea Communications Standards Commission recognizes. Disclaimer or rating icons are not needed.

Rating icons may be transparent, and can be positioned either on the upper-left or upper-right corner of the screen. The icon has a size of at least 1/20 of the screen, and has black writing on a yellow circle with a white outline. These icons are shown for 30 seconds when the programme starts, and are shown again every 10 minutes, and when the programme resumes after commercial breaks. This does not apply to 19-rated programmes, where the icon must be visible throughout the entire programme. These regulations do not apply to the "All" rating, as it does not have an icon. A rating disclaimer is displayed on the start of the programme for five seconds stating "This programme is prohibited for children under the age of X, so parental accompaniment is required" (I peurogeuraemeun X-se mimanui eorini/cheongsonyeoni sicheonghagi-e bujeokjeolhameuro bohoja-ui sicheongjidoga piryohan peurogeuraemimnida.) for 7, 12, and 15 ratings. "All" and "19" ratings have a different disclaimer, which say "This programme is suitable for all ages" (I peurogeuraemeun modeun yeollyeong-ui sicheongjaga sicheonghal su inneun peurogeuraemimnida.) and "This programme is prohibited for children under the age of 19" (I peurogeuraemeun sipguse mimanui cheongsonyeoni sicheonghagi-e bujeokjeolhan peurogeuraemimnida.) respectively.

These ratings are used by all South Korean television broadcasters. Despite being intended for viewing outside of the country, KBS World also uses these ratings.

South Korean television ratings do not include content descriptors or advisories as they do in other nations. The ratings are therefore used in a broader sense.

 Spain 

In Spain, between 1963 and 1985, a rhombus rating system was devised by the Censorship Committee of TVE and first applied on 1 May 1963. Initially it had two levels.

One rhombus (◊) - Not suitable for viewers under the age of 14. Before 1964, the age limit of this rating meant "16 years".
Two rhombuses (◊◊) - Not suitable for viewers under the age of 18.

The two rhombuses appeared in the right upper corner of the screen, generally, at the start of the programmes. From the 1970s, the two rhombuses included, occasionally, a warning tone which is still used as of currently. 
With the fall of the Francoist regime, the censorship and the control of television programmes relaxed, but the two rhombuses still existed to classify certain films and series, especially the ones with erotic, violent or horror content. Eventually, in 1984 every class of regulation clode was eliminated except for the newscasts and the midnight film section aired on Fridays at 00:35 in TVE1 and the newcasts a year later (1985).
Since 1984, except for midnight movies until 1985 and in some series which were aired at the time of the "rhombuses", in none of the two TVE channels had any kind of content regulation code through the two rhombuses anymore and the responsibility was at discretion of the parents, who were in charge to decide which programmes and which films their children would watch or not. At the same time, TVE made an effort to improve its programmation quality, removing controversial programs of specific timeslots and adding more children's programmation.

However, between 1984 and 1996 there was not a lack of a regulation code; the Andalusian regional broadcaster Canal Sur was the only network to retain the two rhombuses system, since its inception in 1989 until 1992.

During the Francoist era and later, the "rhombuses" system had a great influence in the choice of which programmes to watch in family. Since the fall of the Francoist regime, the symbol lost gradually its importance and thus, it was done away with. Currently, although there is a content regulation code with rhombuses, it did not had the same influence as its predecessor.

There is also an influence of said symbol in the Spanish popular language, as something is said to be "de dos rombos" ("of two rhombuses") when it has erotic, violent or off-colour content.

In 1990, with the rise of private television channels, along with the lack of control and controversy created with programmes such as ¡Ay, qué calor! (which was a Spanish version of the Italian game show Colpo grosso) and Tutti Frutti, which aired on Telecinco, a new rating code was created in 1995, but it was not firmly materialized until 1996, which could be reflected in which, for instance, until the summer of that year, instead of the "13" rating, there was the "12" rating, which was retired until 2013. It was at that time when the current classification system was defined.

Until 2011, these icons only were shown at the beginning of the programme. Currently, these are shown during the entire shows.
  (Especialmente recomendada para la infancia). Specially recommended for younger children. Only some channels use this rating, and each has its design (Clan TVE use the words "ERI" (they formerly used a baby icon) inside a purple block and Canal Panda uses a small purple banner).
  (Todos los públicos). For general viewing.
  or  +7 : Not recommended for viewers under the age of 7. It is yellow in Televisió de Catalunya and formerly in Televisión Española. ( until 2012, the icon had yellow background, between 2005 and 2009 the icon was green on TVE).
  or  +10 : Not recommended for viewers under the age of 10. Only exists in Catalan television.
  or  +12 : Not recommended for viewers under the age of 12.
  or  +13 : Not recommended for viewers under the age of 13. It was formerly used in national channels.Although, is worth noting that it is used today by some networks and by Amazon Prime Video as well. It is official in Catalonia, where is used in place of the +12 ratings, although Televisió de Catalunya uses both.
  or  +16 : Not recommended for viewers under the age of 16. ( until July 2015, the icon background was yellow with black lettering, this icon is still used in Catalonia ).
  or  +18 : Not recommended for viewers under the age of 18. A warning tone can be heard when the program starts. These programmes cannot be shown on free to air television before 10 PM and after 6 AM.

Unrated programmes do not display any icon on the screen; in Catalonia, TP-rated shows do not show any icon as well. Nowadays rating symbols are shown during all the programme and in promos; each channel has its right to choose its design and where it has to be placed. The "Infantil" rating it's the exception, because it appears during the first five seconds. In Catalonia, only the 13, 16 and 18 ratings remain transparent in the screen, while the others (7, 10 and 12) are seen during the first 30 seconds.

 Taiwan 

Taiwanese rating system for television programmes was introduced on 1 January 1999 with four symbols represented with four Chinese characters 普 for General, 護 for Protected, 輔 for Parental Guidance and 限 for Restricted, but changed on 13 June 2017 to unify the television age rating with Taiwan's video game and motion picture ratings, and there are five symbols,

 0+: 普遍級(普) (General level) : suitable for watching by general audiences.
Television programmes free of circumstances listed in the preceding four articles and suitable for watching by general audiences may be listed as G .
The images of news reports shall conform to the provisions of "G" rate.

 6+: 保護級(護) (Protected level) : not suitable for viewing by children under the age of six; children over six and under the age of twelve can view if accompanied by parents, teacher or an adult relative.
Television programmes free of circumstances listed in the preceding three articles but portraying any one of the following circumstances shall be listed as P.
 The portrayal of fighting, larceny, terror, abnormal social phenomenon.
 The portrayal of sexual encounters or confused ethics and values.
 Other content that has a detrimental influence on the behaviour or psychology wellbeing of children under the age of six.

 12+: 輔導十二歲級(輔12) (Parental Guidance-12 level) : not suitable for viewing by children under the age of twelve, split from the former rating Parental Guidance.
Television programmes free of circumstances listed in the preceding two articles but portraying any one of the following circumstances shall be listed as PG-12.
 Plots or dialogues that portray crime, violence, terror, blood, abnormality, strangeness or social deformity or other phenomenon, the portrayal of which is slight.
 Content that uses action, images, language, words, dialogue or audio to portray slight sexual expression or sexual implication.
 Other circumstances having detrimental influence on the behaviour or psychology wellbeing children under the age of twelve.

 15+: 輔導十五歲級(輔15) (Parental Guidance-15 level) : not suitable for viewing by people under the age of fifteen, split from the former rating Parental Guidance.
Television programmes free of circumstances listed in Article 4 but portraying any one of the following circumstances shall be listed as PG-15.
 Plots or dialogues that portray crime, terror, blood, violence, abnormality, strangeness or social deformity or other phenomenon, the portrayal of which is not slight but do not cause a sadistic impression or excessive panic.
 Content that uses action, images, language, words, dialogue or audio to represent sexual expression or sexual implication.
 Other content that has a detrimental influence on the behaviour or psychology wellbeing of people under the age of fifteen.

 18+: 限制級(限) (Restricted level) : not suitable for viewing by people under the age of eighteen.
Television programmes portraying any one of the following circumstances shall be listed as R and be broadcast by encryption.
 Detailed portrayal of gambling, use or trafficking of drugs, robbery, kidnap, murder or other criminal behaviours, and detailed portrayal of the process of suicide.
 Content that portrays terror, blood, atrocity, abnormality, etc., the portrayal of which is strong, but acceptable to people over the age of eighteen.
 Content that uses action, images, language, words, dialogue or audio to portray obscenity or strong sexual implication, but is acceptable to people over the age of eighteen.

 Thailand 

In Thailand, a television rating system was introduced in 2006 alongside a movie rating system for movies. In September 2013, the television rating was revised.

Under the new guideline, the so-called 'Free TV' channels have to label their programs and reschedule their shows to comply in the following categories:
 Preschool - content suitable for preschool-aged children
 Children - content suitable for children between 6–12 years old
 General - content suitable for general audiences
 PG 13 - content suitable for people aged 13 and above, but can be watched by those who are under the recommended age if parental guidance is provided. Under this category, the content can be shown on television between 8:30 p.m. and 5:00 a.m.
 PG 18 - content suitable for people aged above 18 years old; those who are younger than 18 must be provided with parental guidance. The programs can be shown on television between 10:00 p.m. and 5:00 a.m.
 Adults - content unsuitable for children and youngsters aged 19 or under, and can be viewed on TV only between 12:00 a.m. and 5:00 a.m.

TV programs in Thailand are already labeled by a certain system of categories, a practice criticised by rights group as nanny-state censorship and ridiculed by some Netizens for its confusing standards.

 Turkey 

The TV content rating system in Turkey was introduced by RTÜK in 2006. The ratings are the following:
  Genel İzleyici – General audience. Suitable for all ages. Shown (family symbol) at the beginning of the programme/movie and after every commercial break.
  7+ – Suitable for ages 7 and over. Shown at the beginning of the programme/movie and after every commercial break.
  13+ – Suitable for ages 13 and over. Shown for the whole duration of the programme/movie (may be translucent). May only be broadcast between 9:30 p.m. and 5:00 a.m.
  18+ – Suitable for ages 18 and over. Shown for the whole duration of the programme/movie (may be translucent). May only be broadcast between 12:00 a.m. and 5:00 a.m.
  Şiddet / Korku – Violence/horror
  Cinsellik – Sexuality
  Olumsuz Örnek Oluşturabilecek Davranışlar – Negative examples

News programmes, sports competitions, religious ceremonies and commercial communication broadcasts are exempt from the content rating system.

 Ukraine 

The Ukrainian TV content rating system was adopted on 15 September 2003. It started with three classifications (●, ▲, ■). On 6 May 2016, the classifications were replaced, and TV shows that do not have age restrictions are not rated. The new ratings are as follows:
 12+: Programme contains content that may require parental guidance for children under 12.
 16+: Programme contains content that may require parental guidance for children under 16.
 18+: Programme is only for viewers aged 18 and over. In it there are scenes containing nudity, drug use, or violence. These programs may only be broadcast late at night (10 p.m.–6 a.m.).

These designations must be displayed on the lower right corner of the television screen.

 United States 
 TV Parental Guidelines 

The TV parental guidelines were first proposed on December 19, 1996, as a voluntary-participation system—in which ratings are determined by participating broadcast and cable networks—by the United States Congress, the television industry and the Federal Communications Commission (FCC), and went into effect by January 1, 1997, on most major broadcast and cable networks in response to concerns from parents and advocacy groups regarding increasingly explicit sexual content, graphic violence and strong profanity in American television programming, and was designed to be used in conjunction with the V-chip, which the U.S. government had mandated to be built into all television sets manufactured from 2000 onward (and the vast majority of cable/satellite set-top boxes). The system—which is used for, including but not limited to, most television series, specials, made-for-television films, and theatrically released films re-edited for broadcast or basic cable telecast—has since been applied to internet-based television services (such as Hulu, Amazon Prime Video and Netflix), digital video retailers (such as Apple’s iTunes Store and Google Play) and digital media players (such as Amazon Fire TV, Apple TV, Android TV and Roku). The guidelines are not assigned to sports or news programs nor are they used during commercial advertisements, outside of promotional ads for network programs.

The rating icons are required to be shown for 15 seconds at the start of each program, although since June 2005, many advertiser-supported network broadcasters and some syndication divisions also display the assigned rating for that particular program after each commercial break; for networks and syndicators that continue to run the rating icon once per hour during a program running longer than 60 minutes, the broadcaster may show the rating again during a segment/scene that starts closest to the top of the next clock hour. Premium channels—in addition to applying them to any offered original programming—may assign Parental Guideline ratings for theatrical or home video-released movies that either did not receive a Motion Picture Association-assigned rating or were aired as an "unrated" cut, which is an exempt.

 TV-Y – This program is aimed at a very young audience, including children from ages 2–6. TV-Y7 – This program is designed for children age 7 and above.  Some programs may be given the "FV" content descriptor if they exhibit more 'fantasy violence' that may be more intense or combative than other programs rated TV-Y7.

 TV-G – Most parents would find this program suitable for all ages.Programs rated TV-G are generally suitable for all ages. The FCC states that "this rating does not signify a program designed specifically for children, most parents may let younger children watch this program unattended." The thematic elements portrayed in programs with this rating contain little or no violence, no strong language, and little or no sexual dialogue or situations.

 TV-PG – Parental guidance is recommended; these programs may be unsuitable for younger children. TV-14 – This program contains some material that many parents would find unsuitable for children under 14 years of age. TV-MA – This program is intended to be viewed by adults and therefore may be unsuitable for children under 17.Some thematic elements, according to the FCC, "may call for parental guidance and/or the program may contain one or more of the following" sub-ratings, designated with an alphabetic letter:
 D – Suggestive dialogue (rarely used with TV-MA-rated programs)
 L – Coarse language
 S – Sexual content
 V – Violence
 FV – Fantasy violence (exclusive to TV-Y7-rated programs)

Up to four content descriptors can be applied along with an applied rating, depending on the kind of suggestive content featured in a program (with the exception of the "FV" sub-rating, due to its sole applicable use for children's programs). As the rating increases pertaining to the age, the content matters generally get more intensive. The 'suggestive dialogue' descriptor is used for TV-PG and TV-14 rated programs only, although certain networks may choose to rate their TV-MA programs with the descriptor, while the DLSV sub-ratings are only used with the TV-PG and TV-14 ratings.

An additional content descriptor, "E/I", is applied to select TV-Y, TV-Y7, and TV-G programs that are designed to meet the educational and informative needs of children aged 16 and under. A minimum of three hours of E/I-compliant programming must be broadcast per week by each television network; E/I programming must air between 6:00 a.m. and 10:00 p.m. to count toward this minimum.

 Content advisory ratings (premium cable and pay-per-view) 

The American pay television industry uses a separate, unrelated content advisory system—used in conjunction with the TV Parental Guidelines and the Motion Picture Association rating system—that first went into effect on March 1, 1994, on participating cable-originated premium channels and pay-per-view services (led by the system's charter services, HBO, Cinemax, Showtime and The Movie Channel). Inspired by similar content guidelines that had already been included in the services’ monthly program guides, the voluntary-participation system provides guidance to pay-cable subscribers on the suitability of a program for certain audiences based on its content. Thematic material is rated based on a ten-code system, designated with a two- or three-letter abbreviation and corresponding descriptor:
 AC – Adult Content
 AL – Adult Language
 GL – Graphic Language (exclusive to R/TV-MA-rated programs)
 MV – Mild Violence
 V – Violence
 GV – Graphic Violence
 BN – Brief Nudity
 N – Nudity
 SSC – Strong Sexual Content (exclusive to R/TV-MA-rated programs)
 RP – Rape

Up to five content descriptors can be applied, alongside the corresponding rating, to an individual program to advise viewers of content that may be inappropriate for minors, depending on age group, or for adults with particular sensitivities to certain kinds of mature content.

 Venezuela 

Television content in Venezuela is regulated by the Law on Social Responsibility on Radio and Television (Ley de Responsabilidad Social en Radio y Televisión''), introduced in January 2003. Free-to-air television broadcasters are required to classify their programmes using the following ratings:

 Todo usuario: Suitable for all ages.
 Supervisado: Parental supervision recommended for children and teens (only allowed between 7:00 p.m. and 7:00 a.m.).
 Adulto: Suitable only for adults aged 18 or older (only allowed between 11:00 p.m. and 5:00 a.m.).

It is mandatory for all Venezuelan television stations to broadcast a short presentation, before the broadcast of any programmes, made by the same channel, where the type of programme (recreational, informational, mixed, etc.), type of production (domestic or national independent) elements include containing (such as language, health, sex and/or violence) and lastly the rating of the programme.

See also 
 Motion picture content rating system
 Video game content rating system
 Watershed (broadcasting)

References 

Self-censorship